Cape Cleveland is a headland in North Greenland. Administratively it is part of the Northeast Greenland National Park.

Geography
Cape Cleveland is located at the northern end of Castle Island, at the mouth of the Sherard Osborn Fjord opposite the eastern shore of Hendrik Island.

Pointing towards the Lincoln Sea, it is one of the two capes of the island, together with the southernmost headland, Cape Gray.

See also
Peary Land

References

Headlands of Greenland